Mikhail Mikhailovich Fonin (1905 – 1974) served as the eighth first secretary of the Communist Party of the Turkmen SSR.

Fonin held this position throughout the German-Soviet War, serving from February 1939 until March 1947. His successor was Şaja Batyrow.

References
Rulers of Soviet Republics

1905 births
1974 deaths
People from Kaluga Governorate
First secretaries of the Communist Party of Turkmenistan
First convocation members of the Supreme Soviet of the Soviet Union
Second convocation members of the Supreme Soviet of the Soviet Union
Recipients of the Order of Lenin